The 1966 United States Senate election in Louisiana was held on November 8, 1966.  Incumbent Democratic Senator Allen Ellender was elected to a sixth term in office.

On August 13, Ellender won the Democratic primary with 74.17% of the vote. At this time, Louisiana was a one-party state and the Democratic nomination was tantamount to victory. Ellender won the November general election without an opponent.

Democratic primary

Candidates
J. D. DeBlieux, State Senator from Baton Rouge and civil rights activist
Allen Ellender, incumbent United States Senator
Troyce Guice, conservative businessman from Ferriday

Results

General election

References

1966
Louisiana
United States Senate
Single-candidate elections